Pascal Zilliox (19 June 1962 – 5 August 2000) is a French long-distance runner. He competed in the men's marathon at the 1992 Summer Olympics.

References

External links

1962 births
2000 deaths
Athletes (track and field) at the 1992 Summer Olympics
French male long-distance runners
French male marathon runners
Olympic athletes of France
Place of birth missing